Trąbki may refer to:

Trąbki, Lesser Poland Voivodeship (south Poland)
Trąbki, Masovian Voivodeship (east-central Poland)
Trąbki, Warmian-Masurian Voivodeship (north Poland)
Trąbki, West Pomeranian Voivodeship (north-west Poland)

See also
Trąby